Welwyn Hatfield is a constituency in Hertfordshire represented in the House of Commons of the UK Parliament since 2005 by Grant Shapps, the Secretary of State for Business, Energy and Industrial Strategy, a Conservative who was previously the Secretary of State for Transport.

History
The seat was created for the February 1974 general election following the second periodic review of Westminster constituencies, initially as the County Constituency of Welwyn and Hatfield. It was formed from parts of the abolished constituency of Hertford.  For the 1983 general election, the constituency was renamed in line with the recently created District of Welwyn Hatfield.

Political history
Despite its short history, the seat has seen two parties serve it, with two Labour periods of representation, during the longer part of the Labour Government 1974-1979 and during the first two terms of the Blair ministry.  Other than this the seat has elected a Conservative as its MP.

The 2005 majority more than tripled on the second election of Grant Shapps, in 2010, from a historically breakable (in the constituency) majority of 5,946 votes to the 26th largest Conservative share of the vote, which on standard uniform swing seen in elections since 1931 represented a safe seat, but a 5% swing to Labour in 2017 means the seat is somewhat marginal again, needing a 7.1% swing to become Labour.

Prominent frontbenchers
The first MP ended his term in the Commons as the member for Welwyn Hatfield before which he was Defence Minister from 1970 to 1972 then a Foreign Office Minister until February 1974 - later that year Lord Balniel was awarded a life peerage, accelerating and safeguarding his right to sit in the Lords.  The second MP later became the politically neutral Lord Speaker, Baroness Hayman.

During five years of the Blair ministry, the constituency's MP Melanie Johnson was a frontbench minister, serving as Economic Secretary to the Treasury, Minister for Competition and Consumers and the Minister for Public Health.
 
Grant Shapps, her successor, was appointed the Minister of State for Housing and Local Government for the first two years of the UK coalition government 2010 before being appointed to chair his party. Following the Conservative victory in 2015, he was appointed Minister of State at the Department for International Development. Shapps became Home Secretary on the 19th October 2022 following the resignation of Suella Braverman.

Constituency profile 
The area has a higher than average proportion of managers, professionals and retired people than much of Greater London. The seat has a strong local economy, with extensive retail and industrial/commercial premises, particularly in Welwyn Garden City and Hatfield. Two of the four largest Hertfordshire economic towns, Stevenage and St Albans are also close by. Accordingly, workless claimants who were registered jobseekers were in November 2012 significantly lower than the national average of 3.8%, at 2.4% of the population based on a statistical compilation by The Guardian.

Boundaries and boundary changes 

1974–1983: The Urban District of Welwyn Garden City, and the Rural Districts of Hatfield and Welwyn.  Both the urban district and the rural district ceased to exist in 1974 and were replaced with the Welwyn Hatfield District.

1983–1995: The District of Welwyn Hatfield wards of Brookmans Park and Little Heath, Haldens, Handside, Hatfield Central, Hatfield East, Hatfield North, Hatfield South, Hollybush, Howlands, Peartree, Sherrards, Welham Green and Redhall, Welwyn East, and Welwyn West, and the City of St Albans ward of Wheathampstead (formerly in the St Albans parliamentary constituency).  The Welwyn Hatfield ward of Northaw was included in the new Broxbourne parliamentary constituency.

1995–2007: As above minus Wheathampstead ward, which was transferred to the new County Constituency of Hitchin and Harpenden.

2007–present: Updated list of Welwyn Hatfield wards, namely Brookmans Park and Little Heath, Haldens, Handside, Hatfield Central, Hatfield East, Hatfield North, Hatfield South, Hatfield West, Hollybush, Howlands, Panshanger, Peartree, Sherrards, Welham Green, Welwyn North, and Welwyn South. Northaw remained in the Broxbourne Constituency.

Members of Parliament

Elections

Elections in the 2010s

Elections in the 2000s

Elections in the 1990s

Elections in the 1980s

Elections in the 1970s

See also 
 List of parliamentary constituencies in Hertfordshire

Notes

References

Parliamentary constituencies in Hertfordshire
Constituencies of the Parliament of the United Kingdom established in 1974
Politics of Welwyn Hatfield